Erron Quincy Kinney (born July 28, 1977) is an American former college and professional football player who was a tight end in the National Football League (NFL) for six seasons during the early 2000s.  Kinney played college football for the University of Florida, and thereafter, he played professionally for the Tennessee Titans of the NFL.

Early life 

Kinney was born in Ashland, Virginia in 1977.  He attended Patrick Henry High School in Ashland, where he played for the Patrick Henry Patriots high school football team.  Among his Patriots teammates was Damien Woody, future lineman for the New York Jets.  Kinney and Woody were members of the 1994 Patriots football team that won the Virginia high school football state championship.

College career 

Kinney accepted an athletic scholarship to attend the University of Florida in Gainesville, Florida, where he played for coach Steve Spurrier's Florida Gators football team from 1996 to 1999.  The Gators coaching staff redshirted him as a true freshman in 1995, but he was a varsity letterman for the 12–1 1996 Gators team that defeated the Florida State Seminoles in the Sugar Bowl to win the Bowl Alliance national championship.  Kinney finished his college career with thirty-nine receptions for 507 yards and five touchdowns.

While attending the University of Florida, Kinney majored in elementary education.

Professional career 

In 2005, he had a career year hauling in fifty-five receptions for 543 yards. Kinney suffered a knee injury in training camp prior to the 2006 season, and was released by the Titans in March 2007. He finished his seven-year NFL career with 178 receptions for 1,750 yards (an average of 9.8 yards per reception) and ten touchdowns.

Life after football 

Interested in fire safety since childhood, on July 28, 2008, Kinney was sworn in as a firefighter in the fire department of the Nashville, Tennessee suburb of Brentwood.  In 2004, Tennessee governor Phil Bredesen appointed him to a seven-year term with the Tennessee State Firefighting Commission, an organization that tests and certifies firefighters in the state.  Kinney was a captain with the St. Andrews Fire Department in Charleston, South Carolina.  He was hired as the first fire chief for the City of Mt. Juliet, Tennessee Fire Department on March 12, 2013. In 2015 he resigned from Mt Juliet. On July 1, 2017 he was appointed chief of the Sherborn, Massachusetts fire department. On September 10, 2019, Kinney was selected to be the Fire Chief for the town of Norfolk, MA. 

He conducts a youth football camp at Lipscomb University in Nashville, Tennessee every summer.

See also 

 Florida Gators
 Florida Gators football, 1990–99
 History of the Tennessee Titans
 List of Florida Gators in the NFL Draft

References

Bibliography 

 Carlson, Norm, University of Florida Football Vault: The History of the Florida Gators, Whitman Publishing, LLC, Atlanta, Georgia (2007).  .
 Golenbock, Peter, Go Gators!  An Oral History of Florida's Pursuit of Gridiron Glory, Legends Publishing, LLC, St. Petersburg, Florida (2002).  .
 Hairston, Jack, Tales from the Gator Swamp: A Collection of the Greatest Gator Stories Ever Told, Sports Publishing, LLC, Champaign, Illinois (2002).  .
 McCarthy, Kevin M.,  Fightin' Gators: A History of University of Florida Football, Arcadia Publishing, Mount Pleasant, South Carolina (2000).  .
 Nash, Noel, ed., The Gainesville Sun Presents The Greatest Moments in Florida Gators Football, Sports Publishing, Inc., Champaign, Illinois (1998).  .

1977 births
Living people
American football tight ends
Florida Gators football players
Florida Gators men's basketball players
Tennessee Titans players
People from Ashland, Virginia
Players of American football from Virginia
American men's basketball players